Mark Keane may refer to:
 Mark Keane (cognitive scientist), Irish cognitive scientist and author 
 Mark Keane (footballer), Irish player of Australian rules football
 Mark Keane (hurler), Irish hurler